Timothy David Smith (born 21 January 1983) is a former English cricketer.  Smith was a right-handed batsman.  He was born in Sheffield, Yorkshire.

Smith made a single Minor Counties Championship appearance for Oxfordshire against Herefordshire in 2001.  In this match, he was dismissed in Oxfordshire's first-innings for a single run by Paul Humphries, while in their second-innings he scored 41 not out.  He also made 2 List A appearances in that season.  The first of these came against the Nottinghamshire Cricket Board in the 1st round of the 2002 Cheltenham & Gloucester Trophy, which was played in 2001.  In this match, he wasn't required to bat, with Oxfordshire winning by 5 wickets.  In the 2nd round against Shropshire, he scored 12 runs before being dismissed by David Boden, with Shropshire winning by 8 runs.

References

External links
Timothy Smith at ESPNcricinfo

1983 births
Living people
Cricketers from Sheffield
English cricketers
Oxfordshire cricketers
English cricketers of the 21st century